Don Daniel Athulathmudali (23 February 1901 – 10 November 1958) was a Ceylonese lawyer and politician.

Don Daniel Athulathmudali was born on 23 February 1901 in Pasdun Korale to Don William Athulathmudali and Wijayagunawardena. He was educated at Ananda College and studied law in England and was called to the English bar in 1926.

He was elected to the State Council of Ceylon from Matugama on 19 June 1931 and served until 7 December 1935.

At the 1st parliamentary election held between 23 August 1947 and 20 September 1947, he contested the seat of Agalawatte, representing the United National Party. He was unsuccessful losing by 779 votes to the Lanka Sama Samaja Party candidate, S. A. Silva.

His eldest son, Lalith, went on to become a prominent politician in Sri Lanka in the 1980s, firstly as the member for Ratmalana (1977-1989) and then as the member for Colombo (1989-1993). His daughter, Sujaee, worked as a doctor in the United Kingdom, while his youngest son, Dayanthe, was an aviation engineer, who served as the country’s Director of Civil Aviation.

References

1901 births
1958 deaths
Alumni of Ananda College
Members of the 1st State Council of Ceylon
Sinhalese lawyers
Sinhalese politicians
United National Party politicians
People from British Ceylon